Kuravanji is a 1960 Indian Tamil language film directed by A. Kasilingam. The film stars Sivaji Ganesan and Savitri. The film, produced by M. Karunanidhi, R. M. Veerappan, and A. Kasilingam, was released on 4 March 1960, and was not a commercial success.

Plot 

The film tells the story of Thenpandiko, the king of Inbapuri. Ellaipuram is a part of the kingdom and the king appoints his brother, Mukhari, to rule it. Mukhari has a minister, Imaya, who has evil designs. Mukhari falls prey to his evil plans, and besides taking over Ellaipuram, he plans to usurp Inbapuri from his brother. To help the suffering people enter a man named Kadhiravan, hailing from the royal family. He moves around the kingdom in the guise of a vagabond. Princess Kumari wishes to marry him, while he falls in love with Ponni, who is from the fisherfolk community. Coming to know of this, Kadhiravan's brother is furious. The princess is equally upset, but Kadhiravan is more interested in saving the people. Soon there is a protest led by him that gains momentum. What happens to it is narrated in the latter half of the film.

Cast 

Male cast
 Sivaji Ganesan as Kathiravan
 O. A. K. Thevar
 R. Balasubramaniam
 M. N. Krishnan
 M. R. Santhanam as Kathiravan's Father
 N. S. Natarajan
 S. V. Ramadas
 Karuppaiah
 Senthamarai
 Jayaraman
 Kuladeivam Rajgopal
 Wahab Kashmiri
 S. R. Gopal
 T. K. Sampangi
 Karikol Raj
 Krishnamurthi
 Rajamohan
 S. A. G. Sami

Female cast
 Savithri as Kuravanji, Kumari
 Mynavathi as Ponni
 Pandari Bai
 Susheela
 Radhabhai as Kathiravan's mother
 C. K. Saraswathi
 Vanaja (Guest Artist)
 Sampathkumari
 Indra
Dance
 Padmini Priyadarshini
 Vijayalakshmi
 Lakshmirajam

Production 
S. S. Rajendran was initially to play the lead role in Kuravanji. However, due to some "friction" between him and M. Karunanidhi, the role was later offered to Sivaji Ganesan. He was hesitant to accept as he believed Rajendran would misunderstand him if he accepted, but after being reassured by Karunanidhi, Ganesan accepted the offer out of respect. Kuravanji is Ganesan's 60th film as an actor. During the shoot, Ganesan chose to wear a gunny sack instead of the woollen clothes that were given to him. He wanted to "connect with the reality of the character of a tribesman".

Soundtrack 
The music was composed by T. R. Pappa. Lyrics were by Thirikooda Rasappa Kavirayar, Thanjai N. Ramaiah Dass, Kannadasan, M. Karunanidhi and Kudanthai R. Krishnamurthi.

Reception 
Kanthan of Kalki noted that the film's lengthy runtime was not a detriment to it being an entertainer.

References

Bibliography

External links 
 

1960 films
1960s Tamil-language films
Films scored by T. R. Pappa
Films with screenplays by M. Karunanidhi